The Jubilee of Mr Ikel is a 1955 Yugoslav feature film directed by Vatroslav Mimica. While Mimica had several writing credits, this was his directorial debut.

Cast 
 Antun Nalis as Teodor Ikel, a man who awakes in a grave to discover those who knew him celebrating his alleged death. Nalis was also a co-writer along with Mimica for the movie.
 Borivoj Sembera as 	Dr. Mihajlo Miki Laufer
 Lila Anders as Estera Ikel
 Mila Mosinger as Irma Bazul
 Zvonko Strmac as Florijan Krkac
 Nela Eržišnik as Flora Krkac
 Divor Zilic as Veselko Krkac

External links

The Jubilee of Mr Ikel at Filmski-Programi.hr 

1955 films
Yugoslav crime films
Serbo-Croatian-language films
Films directed by Vatroslav Mimica
Jadran Film films
Croatian black-and-white films
Yugoslav black-and-white films
Films set in 1929
Films set in Zagreb
Yugoslav comedy films